Mua may refer to:

Mu'a (Tongatapu), the ancient capital of Tonga
Mu'a, a village on Niuafoou, Tonga
Mu'a, a village on Eua, Tonga, founded by people from Niuafoou
Mua District, of Wallis and Futuna

See also
Mua (disambiguation)